Vladislav Kreida (born 25 September 1999) is an Estonian professional footballer who plays as a midfielder for League of Ireland Premier Division club St Patrick's Athletic, on loan from Meistriliiga club Flora. He also represents the Estonia national team.

Club career
Born in Tallinn, Kreida played youth football with local sides Štrommi and TJK Legion before signing for Flora in 2016. He initially played with Flora III and Flora II before making his first team debut in 2017. Kreida was part of the team that won the Meistriliiga in 2019 and 2020, as well as winning the Estonian Cup in 2019–20. In 2021, he was loaned out to Superettan side Helsingborgs IF who he helped to promotion to the Allsvenskan. In early 2022, he signed for Ukrainian Premier League side Veres Rivne but returned to his parent club without making an appearance due to the 2022 Russian invasion of Ukraine. On 31 March 2022, Kreida joined Skövde AIK in Sweden on loan. He picked up his third Meistriliiga medal following Flora's league win in 2022. Kreida signed for League of Ireland Premier Division club St Patrick's Athletic on a season long loan deal on 12 January 2023. He made his debut on 17 February 2023 in the first game of the season against Derry City, providing an assist for Joe Redmond's 89th minute equaliser in a 1–1 draw.

International career
Kreida made his senior international debut for Estonia on 11 June 2019, replacing Konstantin Vassiljev in the 82nd minute of a 0–8 away loss to Germany in a UEFA Euro 2020 qualifying match. In June 2021, Kreida featured in both a 1–0 win over Lithuania and a 2–1 win over Latvia which resulted in his country winning the 2020 Baltic Cup.

Career statistics

Club

International

Honours

Club
Flora
Meistriliiga: 2019, 2020, 2022
Estonian Cup: 2019–20

International
Baltic Cup: 2020

References

External links

1999 births
Living people
Footballers from Tallinn
Estonian people of Russian descent
Estonian footballers
Association football midfielders
Esiliiga players
Meistriliiga players
FC Flora players
Estonia youth international footballers
Estonia under-21 international footballers
Estonia international footballers
Tallinna JK Legion players
Helsingborgs IF players
NK Veres Rivne players
Skövde AIK players
St Patrick's Athletic F.C. players
League of Ireland players
Expatriate footballers in Ukraine
Expatriate footballers in Sweden
Estonian expatriate footballers
Estonian expatriate sportspeople in Sweden
Estonian expatriate sportspeople in Ukraine
Estonian expatriate sportspeople in Ireland
Expatriate association footballers in the Republic of Ireland